Machos is a community in the municipal unit of Vartholomio, northwestern Elis, Greece. The population was 470 in 2001. It is situated in a rural plain, 2 km west of Dimitra, 3 km southwest of Neochori and 2 km northwest of Vartholomio.

Population

See also

List of settlements in Elis

References

External links
GTP - Machos

Vartholomio
Populated places in Elis